Bartłomiej Aleksander Zdaniuk (born 1975) is a Polish political scientist who serves as an ambassador of Poland to Senegal. Prior to that he was ambassador toMoldova from 2017 to 2022.

Life 
Zdaniuk graduated from University of Warsaw, Faculty of Political Sciences (1999). He was studying also at the Science Po (Paris) and the Alecu Russo University of Bălți. In 2007 he defended his PhD thesis on French legislative elections between 1789 and 1914 and, in 2016, post-doctoral degree (habilitation) on politics of Moldova.

In 1999, he began his professional career as a university teacher at the University of Warsaw, becoming an assistant professor. He participated in two OSCE missions to Moldova: 2014, 2016. He authored four monographs, and several articles, as well as translations. He is a member of International Political Science Association.

Following his nomination on Poland Ambassador to Moldova in September 2017, on 18 October 2017 he presented his letter of credence to the President of Moldova Igor Dodon. He ended his term on 28 February 2022. On 30 November 2022, Zdaniuk was appointed ambassador to Senegal, accredited also to the Gambia, Guinea, Guinea-Bissau, Ivory Coast, Mali, Burkina Faso and Cape Verde. He began his term on 2 February 2023.

Besides Polish, he speaks Romanian, Russian, French, and English languages. He has also passive knowledge of Ukrainian.

Works 

 Konsolidacja państwa w Republice Mołdawii, Warszawa 2016.
 Konstytucja Republiki Mołdawii [Constituţia Republicii Moldova], [translation from Romanian], Warszawa 2014.
 Historia do 1918 roku. Perspektywa kulturowo-cywilizacyjna, Warszawa 2014 [with: Wojciech Jakubowski and Mariusz Włodarczyk].
 Wybory parlamentarne we Francji 1789–1914: problem reprezentatywności wyboru, Warszawa 2005.

References

External links 

 Bartłomiej Zdaniuk Twitter

1975 births
Ambassadors of Poland to Moldova
Ambassadors of Poland to Senegal
Living people
Polish political scientists
University of Warsaw alumni
Academic staff of the University of Warsaw